Ana-Maria Berdilă (born ) is a Romanian female volleyball player. She is part of the Romania women's national volleyball team.

She competed at the 2015 Women's European Volleyball Championship. 
On club level she plays for Penicilina Iași.

References

External links
http://www.scoresway.com/?sport=volleyball&page=player&id=14521
http://www.monitoruldegalati.ro/sport/23163-ana-maria-berdila-a-devenit-campioana-nationala-la-volei-pe-plaja/-23163-ana-maria-berdila-a-devenit-campioana-nationala-la-volei-pe-plaja.html
http://www.absport.ro/volei/adina-salaoru-ioana-nemtanu-si-anamaria-berdila-de-la-volei-alba-blaj-vor-participa-la-campionatul-european-de-volei/ 
http://ziarulunirea.ro/foto-volei-alba-blaj-csm-lugoj-3-0-campioana-a-4-a-victorie-la-rand-fara-emotii-394732/

1993 births
Living people
Romanian women's volleyball players
Place of birth missing (living people)